Phillip Richardson may refer to:
 Phillip Richardson (cyclist), Trinidadian cyclist
 Phillip J. S. Richardson, British writer on dancing
 Philip Richardson, British sport shooter and politician
 Philip Richardson (bishop), New Zealand Anglican bishop
 Phil Richardson, member of the Oklahoma House of Representatives